Giedrius Tomkevičius (born 29 February 1984) is a Lithuanian football midfielder currently playing for Bjørnevatn IL in Norsk Tipping Ligaen avd. 2 in Norway.

Tomkevičius made one appearance for the Lithuania national football team during 2008.

References

External links
 

1986 births
Living people
Lithuanian footballers
Lithuania international footballers
FK Ekranas players
FK Daugava (2003) players
Lithuanian expatriate footballers
Expatriate footballers in Latvia
Lithuanian expatriate sportspeople in Latvia
Association football midfielders